Anita Kwiatkowska, née Chojnacka (born ) is a Polish former volleyball player, playing as a right side hitter. She was part of the Poland women's national volleyball team.

She competed at the 2011 Women's European Volleyball Championship. On club level she played for KPSK Stal Mielec.

References

External links
http://www.scoresway.com/?sport=volleyball&page=player&id=2074
http://www.zimbio.com/photos/Anita+Kwiatkowska/Women+Volleyball+European+Championship+Poland/-ywjd74bCvi

1985 births
Living people
Polish women's volleyball players
People from Piła